John W. McCarter Jr. (born 1938) is an American business executive and public educator, notable for his long tenure as president and CEO of the Field Museum in Chicago.

Early life and education
Born in Oak Park, Illinois, McCarter is the son of John W. McCarter Sr., and Ruth McCarter. He graduated from Princeton University in 1960. His senior thesis, in the Woodrow Wilson School, was on mayor Richard J. Daley and the Chicago democratic organization. He attended the London School of Economics in 1960-1961 and received an M.B.A. from the Harvard Business School in 1963.

Business career
From 1963, McCarter was with Booz Allen & Hamilton, Inc., consultanting with companies in agriculture, pharmaceuticals, and nutrition, and rising to vice president (1968-1969) McCarter was president of DeKalb Corporation and DeKalb-Pfizer Genetics until asked to resign by the board in 1986. At that time he rejoined Booz Allen, advancing to senior vice president.

Government service
McCarter served as a White House fellow in the Bureau of the Budget in 1966–1967, during the Johnson administration. He directed the Illinois Department of Finance and newly created Bureau of the Budget from 1969 to 1972, under Governor Richard B. Ogilvie.

Later career
Leaving Booz Allen, McCarter served as president and CEO of the Field Museum from 1996 until 2012, during which time McCarter was known for his work to modernize and expand the Museum's mission. He has been a trustee of the University of Chicago, a trustee of Princeton University, a member of the Board of Governors of Argonne National Laboratory, a Regent of the Smithsonian Institution, and a trustee and chair of Chicago's public television station, and has been a director or trustee of companies including W.W. Grainger, Janus Funds, and Divergence, Inc.

Honors and awards
McCarter is a Fellow of the American Academy of Arts and Sciences.

Personal life
McCarter married Judith Field West in 1965. They have three children.

References

1938 births
Living people
Harvard Business School alumni
Princeton School of Public and International Affairs alumni
Alumni of the London School of Economics
American chief executives
Members of the Inter-American Dialogue